Bőcs KSC is a Hungarian football club located in Bőcs, Hungary. It played in the Hungarian National Championship II division until 2011, when the club was moved to Balmazújváros and renamed as Balmazújvárosi FC. Böcs KSC was refounded at the summer of 2011. The team's colors are green and yellow.

External links
Official site

Football clubs in Hungary
Association football clubs established in 1948
1948 establishments in Hungary